Cambarus scotti, the Chattooga River Crayfish, is a species of crayfish in the family Cambaridae. It is endemic to Alabama and Georgia. The common name refers to the Chattooga River. The original specimens were collected from Clarks Creek in Chattooga County.

The IUCN conservation status of Cambarus scotti is "LC", least concern, with no immediate threat to the species' survival. The IUCN status was reviewed in 2010.

References

Further reading

 
 
 

Cambaridae
Articles created by Qbugbot
Crustaceans described in 1981
Freshwater crustaceans of North America
Taxa named by Horton H. Hobbs Jr.